The Women in Technology International Hall of Fame was established in 1996 by Women in Technology International (WITI) to honor women who contribute to the fields of science and technology.

Women in Technology International Hall of Fame inductees

1996

 Ruth Leach Amonette (1916–2004), IBM's first woman vice president (1943–1953)
 Dr. Eleanor K. Baum (1940–), American electrical engineer and educator. First female dean of (Cooper Union) School of Engineering. First female president of the American Society for Engineering Education
 Dr. Jaleh Daie (1948–), managing partner, Aurora Equity, a Palo Alto-based investment company financing technology start ups. Treasurer of US Space Foundation (first woman appointed to its board of directors). Member of Band of Angels
 Dr. Barbara Grant, venture capitalist, former vice president and general manager in the Data Storage Division at IBM
 Stephanie L. Kwolek (1923–2014), inventor of poly-paraphenylene terephthalamide (Kevlar)
 Dr. Misha Mahowald (1963–1996), computational neuroscientist
 Linda Sanford (1953–), IBM Enterprise Transformation (see also Linda Sanford's Oral History Interview)
 Dr. Cheryl L. Shavers (1953–), Under Secretary for Technology, US Commerce Department (1999–2001)
 Dr. Sheila Widnall (1938–), American aerospace researcher and Institute Professor at Massachusetts Institute of Technology. United States Secretary of the Air Force (1993–1997) (first female Secretary of the Air Force). First woman to lead an entire branch of the U.S. military in the Department of Defense
 Dr. Chien-Shiung Wu (1912–1997), Chinese-American physicist who worked on Manhattan Project

1997

 Frances Allen (1932–2020), American computer scientist and pioneer in the field of optimizing compilers  (see also Frances Allen's Oral History Interview)
 Carol Bartz (1948– ), former president and CEO of Yahoo!, former chairman, president and CEO at Autodesk
 The ENIAC Programmers: The original six women programmers of ENIAC (Electronic Numerical Integrator And Computer), first general-purpose electronic digital computer
Kathleen Antonelli (1921–2006)
Jean Jennings Bartik (1924–2011)
Frances Snyder Holberton (1917–2001)
Marlyn Wescoff Meltzer (1922–2008)
Frances Bilas Spence (1922–2012)
Ruth Lichterman Teitelbaum (1924–1986)
 Pamela Meyer Lopker, founder, president and chairman of the board, QAD Inc., an Enterprise Resource Planning / manufacturing software company
 Marcia Neugebauer (1932–), American geophysicist whose research yielded first direct measurements of solar wind and shed light on its physics and interaction with comet
 Donna Shirley (1941–), former manager of Mars Exploration at the NASA Jet Propulsion Laboratory (see also Donna Shirley Oral History Interview at NASA Oral History Project: "Herstory", Donna Shirley Interviews, Mars Exploration Program)
 Shaunna Sowell, former vice president and manager of Worldwide semiconductor Facilities, Texas Instruments
 Patty Stonesifer (1956–), former co-chair and chief executive officer of Bill and Melinda Gates Foundation, current president and CEO of Martha's Table
 Patricia Wallington, former corporate vice president and CIO, Xerox Corporation
 Rosalyn S. Yalow (1921–2011), American medical physicist, and co-winner of 1977 Nobel Prize in Physiology or Medicine (together with Roger Guillemin and Andrew Schally) for development of the radioimmunoassay (RIA) technique. She was the second American woman to be awarded the Nobel Prize Physiology or Medicine after Gerty Cori

1998

 Dr. Anita Borg (1949–2003), American computer scientist who founded the Institute for Women and Technology (now the Anita Borg Institute for Women and Technology) and the Grace Hopper Celebration of Women in Computing
 Mildred Spiewak Dresselhaus (1930–2017), Institute Professor and Professor of Physics and Electrical Engineering (Emeritus) in the area of condensed matter physics at Massachusetts Institute of Technology. (see also Vegas Science Trust video interviews with scientists: Mildred Dresselhaus)
 Dr. Gertrude B. Elion (1918–1999), American biochemist and pharmacologist; 1988 recipient of Nobel Prize in Physiology or Medicine.  Research led to the development of AIDS drug AZT
 Julie Spicer England former vice president, Texas Instruments, Incorporated General Manager, RFid Systems
 Eleanor Francis Helin (1932–2009), American astronomer who was principal investigator of Near-Earth Asteroid Tracking (NEAT) program of NASA's Jet Propulsion Laboratory

1999

 Yvonne Claeys Brill (1924–2013), Canadian scientist known for development of rocket and jet propulsion technologies at NASA and the International Maritime Satellite Organization. (see also National Science & Technology Medals Foundation video)
 Sherita T. Ceasar, Vice President Product Engineering Planning and Strategy, Comcast Communications
 Dr. Thelma Estrin (1924–2014), computer scientist and engineer who pioneered work in expert systems and biomedical engineering. She was one of the first to apply computer technology to healthcare and medical research
 Dr. Claudine Simson, former executive vice president, chief technology officer, LSI Corporation; current Director & Business Development Executive, Research and IP, Worldwide Growth Markets, IBM Corporation
 Yukako Uchinaga, vice president, IBM's Yamato Software Development Laboratory (see also Yukako Uchinaga's Oral History Interview)

2000

 Dr. Bonnie Dunbar (1949–), former NASA astronaut; former president and CEO of The Museum of Flight. Leads the University of Houston's STEM Center (science, technology, engineering and math) and joined the faculty of the Cullen College of Engineering. (see also Q&A with Dr. Bonnie Dunbar, University of Houston Cullen College of Engineering)
 Dr. Irene Greif, founder of field of Computer-Supported Cooperative Work (CSCW). IBM Fellow; director, Collaborative User Experience research and IBM Center for Social Business.
 Dr. Darleane C. Hoffman (1926–), American nuclear chemist among researchers who confirmed existence of Seaborgium, element 106
 Dr. Jennie S. Hwang, first woman to receive Ph.D. from Case Western Reserve University's Materials Science and Engineering; expert in surface-mount technology
 Dr. Shirley Ann Jackson (1946–), president of Rensselaer Polytechnic Institute. American physicist. First African-American to serve as chairman of U.S. Nuclear Regulatory Commission, elected to U.S. National Academy of Engineering, and to receive Vannevar Bush Award. She is first African-American woman to lead a top-50 national research university

2001
 Duy-Loan Le (1962–), Vietnamese American engineer and first woman and Asian to be elected to rank of Texas Instruments Senior Fellow
 Janet Perna, former general manager of information management solutions at [IBM] specializing in distributed database systems / IBM DB2 (see also Janet Perna's oral history)
 Darlene Solomon, senior vice president, chief technology officer, Agilent Technologies  specializing in Bio-analytical and electronic measurement

2002

 Judy Estrin, American business executive, JLabs, LLC.  Former chief technology officer for Cisco Systems
 Dr. Caroline Kovac, former general manager, IBM Healthcare and Life Sciences (see also Caroline Kovac's oral history)
 Dr. Elaine Surick Oran, senior scientist, Reactive Flow Physics, U.S. Naval Research Lab, Laboratory for Computational Physics and Fluid Dynamics

2003
 Chieko Asakawa (1958–), IBM Fellow. Group Leader, IBM Tokyo Research Laboratory, Accessibility Research; developed IBM Home Page Reader, a self-voicing web browser designed for people who are blind (see also Japanese Wikipedia entry)
 Wanda Gass, Texas Instruments Fellow; executive director and founder, High-Tech High Heels ("HTHH"), a donor-advised fund at Dallas Women's Foundation that funds programs to prepare girls to pursue degrees in Science, Technology, Engineering and Math (STEM)  (see also Wanda Gass oral history)
 Dr. Kristina M. Johnson (1957-), American former government official, academic, engineer, and business executive
 Shirley C. McCarty, aerospace consultant

2004

Dr. Mary-Dell Chilton, Ph.D. (1939–), founder of modern plant biotechnology and genetic modification;  known as the "queen of Agrobacterium"
Eileen Gail de Planque, Ph.D. (1944–2010), expert on environmental radiation measurements;  first woman and first health physicist to become a Nuclear Regulatory Commission Commissioner; technical areas of expertise include solid state dosimetry, radiation transport and shielding, environmental radiation, nuclear facilities monitoring and problems of reactor and personnel dosimetry
 Dr. Pat Selinger, IBM Fellow; American computer scientist best known for her work on relational database management systems (see also Patricia Selinger oral history)
 Judy Shaw, director, CMOS Module Development at Texas Instruments
 Dr. Susan Solomon (1956–2010), atmospheric chemist; first to propose chlorofluorocarbon free radical reaction mechanism as cause of Antarctic ozone hole

2005

 Barbara Bauer, technology innovation, software development, global management
 Sonja Bernhardt OAM (1959–), Australian information technology executive; founder and Inaugural President of WiT (Women in Technology) in Queensland
 Sandra Burke Ph.D., cardiovascular physiologist, former pre-clinical cardiovascular researcher at Abbott Vascular's Research and Advanced Development; developed drug-coated stent intravascular stents for treatment of restenosis
 Melendy Lovett, senior vice president of Texas Instruments; president of Texas Instruments's worldwide Education Technology business; STEM education and workforce advocate, High-Tech High Heels (HTHH)
 Amparo Moraleda Martínez (1964–), former COO Iberdrola International Division; former president for Southern Europe, IBM (see also Spanish language Wikipedia entry)
 Neerja Raman, global manufacturing and poverty. Senior Research Fellow, Stanford University; advisor, Committee for Cyber-Infrastructure, National Science Foundation; formerly HP Labs

2006
Maria Azua, former IBM Vice President of Advanced Cloud Solutions, former IBM VP of Technology & Innovation; patent in Transcoder technology, Java implementation and enhancements, data manipulation
Françoise Barré-Sinoussi (1947–) French virologist; director of Regulation of Retroviral Infections Division (Unité de Régulation des Infections Rétrovirales) at Institut Pasteur. Nobel Prize in Physiology or Medicine (2008) for discovery of virus responsible for HIV
Kim Jones, former president and managing director for Sun Microsystems UK & Ireland; former VP of Global Education, Government and Health Sciences, Sun Microsystems; chairman of the board and chief executive officer of Curriki
Nor Rae Spohn, former SVP Hewlett-Packard LaserJet Printing Business
Dr. Been-Jon Woo, director, Technology Integration & Development, Intel

2007

 Dr. Wanda M. Austin (1954–), first African American President and CEO, The Aerospace Corporation
 Helen Greiner (1967–), co-founder of iRobot; CEO of CyPhyWorks, maker of the hover drone. Director of the board, Open Source Robotics Foundation (see also National Center for Women & Information Technology (NCWIT), Interview with Helen Greiner)
 Lucy Sanders, CEO and co-founder of National Center for Women & Information Technology (NCWIT); Executive-in-Residence for ATLAS Institute at University of Colorado at Boulder
 Padmasree Warrior, chief technology and strategy officer of Cisco Systems; former CTO of Motorola, Inc.

2008

 Deborah Estrin (1959–), Ph.D., works in networked sensors. First academic faculty member at Cornell Tech; founding director, Center for Embedded Networked Sensing, UCLA. Winner of a 2018 MacArthur Fellowship.
 Dr. Susan P. Fisher-Hoch (1940-), expert on infectious diseases; professor of epidemiology, The University of Texas Health Science Center School of Public Health
 Mary Lou Jepsen, head of Display Division at Google X Lab; founder of Pixel Qi, a manufacturer of low-cost, low-power LCD screens for laptops; co-founder and first Chief Technology Officer One Laptop per Child (OLPC) (see also TED talk)
 Gordana Vunjak-Novakovic, Serbian American professor of biomedical engineering, Columbia University; director, Columbia's Laboratory for Stem Cells and Tissue Engineering.  Areas of research: tissue engineering, bioreactors, biophysical regulation, tissue development, stem cell research.
 Jian (Jane) Xu, Ph.D., CTO, IBM China Systems and Technology Labs; Distinguished Engineer of IBM Watson Research, focusing on the research of IT and Wireless Convergence

2009

 Patricia S. Cowings (1948–), first African-American female scientist to be trained as an astronaut payload specialist; Research Psychologist, Human Systems Integrations Division, NASA Ames Research Center
 Maxine Fassberg, vice president, Technology and Manufacturing Group, Fab 28 Plant manager; general manager, Intel Israel
 Dr. Sharon Nunes, VP, IBM's Smarter Cities Strategy & Solutions, which focuses on improving quality of life at urban centers worldwide by partnering with city governments to improve transportation, waste management and energy use
 Dr. Carolyn Turbyfill, VP Engineering, Stacksafe

2010

 Sandy Carter, IBM's worldwide VP, Social Business Evangelism and Sales, IBM’s Social Business initiative
 Dr. Ruth A. David, president and CEO, ANSER (Analytic Services Inc); Member, Homeland Security Advisory Council; former deputy director for Science and Technology, CIA.
 Adele Goldberg (1945–), computer scientist; participated in developing programming language Smalltalk-80 and various concepts related to object-oriented programming while a researcher at Xerox Palo Alto Research Center (PARC), in the 1970s, then founding chairman, ParcPlace Systems, Inc.
 Susie Wee, CTO, Cisco Systems;  former CTO, Client Cloud Services, HP Labs. Focus on streaming media; co-edited JPSEC standard for JPEG-2000 image security (see also TED TEDxBayArea Women talk)
 Dr. Ruth Westheimer (born Karola Siegel  (born 1928); known as "Dr. Ruth"), German-American sex therapist, talk show host, author, professor, Holocaust survivor, and former Haganah sniper.

2011

 Alicia Abella, Ph.D., executive director, Innovative Services Research, AT&T Labs; Member, President's Advisory Commission on Educational Excellence for Hispanics
 Evelyn Berezin (1925–2018), American computer engineer best known for designing one of the first word processors. She also helped design some of the first computer reservations systems, computer data systems for banks; Management Consultant, Brookhaven Science Associates (BSA) (BSA manages Brookhaven National Laboratory for Department of Energy's Office of Science)
 Diane Pozefsky, Ph.D., research professor, Department of Computer Science, University of North Carolina; specialized in networking technologies at IBM (see also IBM Diane Pozefsky oral history)
 Sophie V. Vandebroek, Ph.D., CTO and president, Xerox Innovation Group, Xerox Corporation
 Lynda Weinman (1955–), co-founder and executive chair, Lynda.com, an online software training web site

2012
 Genevieve Bell, Ph.D., Australian anthropologist and researcher.  Intel Fellow; director, User Interaction and Experience, Intel Labs, Intel Corporation
 Joanne Martin, Ph.D. (1947–). Served on management team that developed and delivered IBM's first supercomputer, with specific responsibility for the performance measurement and analysis of the system. Distinguished Engineer and VP of Technology, IBM Corporation
 Jane Lubchenco (1947-), Ph.D. Ukrainian-American environmental scientist and marine ecologist; first woman administrator of National Oceanic and Atmospheric Administration (NOAA); (see also Charlie Rose interview); Haas Distinguished Visitor, Stanford University
 Gwynne Shotwell (1963-), president, SpaceX (see also Shotwell: The Future of Space talk at Northwestern)

2013

Marian Croak, senior vice president of applications and services infrastructure at AT&T Labs
Peggy Johnson, executive vice president of Qualcomm Technologies and president of Global Market Development
Lisa McVey, CIO of Enterprise Information Systems, Enterprise Medical Imaging, Automation, McKesson Corporation
Heidi Roizen (1958-), Venture Partner of Draper Fisher Jurvetson
Laura Sanders, general manager of delivery engineering and technology and CTO for Global Technology Services, IBM Corporation

2014

Orna Berry (1949-), Israeli corporate vice president, growth and innovation, EMC Centers of Excellence EMEA, EMC Corporation
Jennifer Pahlka (1969-), founder and executive director, Code for America
Kim Polese (1961-), chair, ClearStreet
Kris Rinne, senior vice president, network and product planning, AT&T Services, Inc.
Lauren States, vice president, strategy and transformation, IBM Software Group

2015
Cheemin Bo-Linn, president and CEO, Peritus Partners
Nichelle Nichols (1932-), American actor
Pam Parisian, chief information officer, AT&T
Sheryl Root, president and CEO, RootAnalysis
Marie Wieck, general manager, Middleware, IBM

2016
Kimberly Bryant Founder and executive director, Black Girls Code
Roberta Banaszak Gleiter CEO, Global Institute For Technology & Engineering
Harriet Green OBE, general manager, IBM
Jennifer Yates, Ph.D., assistant vice president, AT&T 
Ellie Yieh, corporate vice president, Applied Materials

2017
Beena Ammanath, Global Vice President, Hewlett Packard Enterprise
Krunali Patel Vice President, Texas Instruments
Lisa Seacat DeLuca, Strategist, IBM 
Selma Svendsen Senior Director, iRobot
Elizabeth Xu, chief technology officer, BMC Software

2018
Rhonda Childress, IBM Fellow VP – GTS Data Security and Privacy Officer, IBM
Elizabeth "Jake" Feinler, Internet Pioneer
Roz Ho, Senior VP and GM, Consumer & Metadata, TiVo
Santosh K. Kurinec, Rochester Institute of Technology, professor of electrical and microelectronic engineering
Yanbing Li, Ph.D., Sr VP and general manager, Storage and Availability Business Uni, VMware
Rashmi Rao, Global Head, Advanced Engineering, CoC User Experience, Harman

2019
 Heather Hinton, vice president and IBM Distinguished Engineer, IBM.
 Julia Liuson, corporate vice president, Developer Tools, Microsoft.
 Dr. Sara Rushinek, professor of business technology and health informatics, University of Miami.
 Dr. Natalia Trayanova, professor of biomedical engineering and medicine, Johns Hopkins University
 Blanca Treviño, president and CEO, Softtek

2021
Arundhati Bhattacharya, chairperson and chief executive officer for the State Bank of India
Lisa P. Jackson, EPA Administrator
Olu Maduka, Founding Board Member and current Chairman of the Board of Women in Energy, Oil, and Gas Nigeria (WEOG)
Karen Quintos, senior vice president and chief marketing officer – Dell Inc.
Angie Ruan, vice president of engineering at Chime
Lisa T. Su, Ph.D., president and CEO, Advanced Micro Devices
Kara Swisher, editor-at-large of New York Medi
Tae Yoo, senior vice president, corporate affairs and corporate social responsibility, Cisco

References

External links
WITI website
WITI Hall of Fame website

Lists of engineers
Lists of hall of fame inductees
Technology International
Science and technology hall of fame inductees
Women's halls of fame